Imanol Ordorika Sacristán (born in Mexico City, October 31, 1958) is a Mexican social activist, political leader, academic and intellectual. He was one of the initiators and principal leaders of the Consejo Estudiantil Universitario (University Student Council) at the National Autonomous University of Mexico (Universidad Nacional Autónoma de México, UNAM), with Carlos Imaz Gispert and Antonio Santos Romero, from 1986 to 1990. A founder and prominent member of the Partido de la Revolución Democrática (PRD) until 2001. Professor of social sciences and education at the Universidad Nacional Autonoma de Mexico. Ordorika is an active participant in the Mexican political debate as well as an Op-ed writer for La Jornada and other Mexican media.

Biography
Imanol Ordorika Sacristan was born in Mexico City on October 31, 1958. His father is the renown Mexican architect Imanol Ordorika Bengoechea (1931-1988) and Maria Josefa Sacristan (born 1936). Both of his parents originally hail from Spain; his father was born in Lekeitio, Biscay, while his mother was born in Madrid. Ordorika is the grandson of renown economist and politician Antonio Sacristán Colás. His parents and grandparents established in Mexico as refugees from the Spanish Civil War since 1939. As part of a progressive family he became acquainted with the ideals of Spanish left wing republicanism, with the Cuban Revolution, and with the 1968 Mexican student movement, since his early childhood.

Student activism and university participation

Ordorika majored in physics at the Facultad de Ciencias in the Universidad Nacional Autónoma de México in 1991. It is during his student days in the 1980s that he became a militant of the Mexican revolutionary left (izquierda revolucionaria) through the Comité Estudiantil de Solidaridad Obrero Campesina (CESOC) and as a member of Revista Punto Critico, a marxist organization and journal founded by the leaders of the 1968 Mexican student movement, and later Convergencia Comunista 7 de enero (CC7). He became an important student leader and representative to UNAM's University Council and gained national prominence with the creation of the Consejo Estudiantil Universitario in 1986.

As a student member of the Council first, and with the Consejo Estudiantil, starting on October 31, 1986, Ordorika rejected structural adjustment policies affecting Mexican universities and, more concretely, attempts to increase tuition, restrictive student selection policies and standardized testing, proposed by rector Jorge Carpizo McGregor, at the Universidad Nacional Autonoma de Mexico. Ordorika participated in public debates (diálogos públicos) between UNAM administrators and student leaders at the Che Guevara/Justo Sierra auditorium, transmitted live by university radio and featured prominently by the Mexican media in January 1987. During the student strike in February he was one of the selected spokespersons until CEU defeated Carpizo's structural adjustment reforms.

National politics
In 1988 Ordorika, Santos and Imaz led Mexican university students to support Cuauhtemoc Cardenas' independent presidential candidacy against the ruling Partido Revolucionario Institucional's Carlos Salinas. For this purpose they created the Movimiento al Socialismo (MAS) notably featuring Adolfo Gilly, Salvador Martínez della Rocca, Enrique González Rojo, Raul Alvarez Garin and others.

He was one of the founder and leaders of newly formed left wing party Partido de la Revolución Democrática (PRD), led by Cárdenas.  Ordorika was a member of PRD's National Committee from 1990 to 1995.  In 1994 he ran as this party's candidate for Federal Congress in Mexico City district XXII.

During the 2000 presidential electoral campaign, Ordorika was appointed spokesperson and campaign head of communications for left wing candidate Cuauhtemoc Cardenas. After the elections and the 2001 PRD congress Ordorika abandoned this party and exercised a strong critique against its bureaucratic trends and centrist political positions.

Imanol Ordorika is also involved in the Mexican contemporary political debate as a public speaker, an editorial writer at La Jornada and a media commentator.

Academic life
Ordorika started his studies in physics at Facultad de Ciencias in 1974, but after 15 years he failed and joined CEU. In 1989 he became adjunct professor at the Instituto de Investigaciones Económicas at UNAM. From 1988 to 1990 he was elected member of the organizing committee for the University Congress at this university. In 1990, he was elected faculty representative to the University Congress. From 2004 to 2008 he was faculty representative to the university senate at UNAM.

Ordorika obtained Master in Arts degrees in education (1993) and sociology (1998) as well as a Ph.D degree in social sciences and education from the Stanford Graduate School of Education (1999). He has been a full professor at UNAM since 2002. Ordorika is a faculty member and higher education specialist in Mexico and abroad. He has written extensively on power relations and politics within postsecondary institutions, faculty and student movements, higher education policy and on the impact of globalization on colleges and universities. In 2004 Ordorika received the Frank Talbott Jr. Visiting University Chair from the University of Virginia and in 2006 he was awarded the Alfonso Reyes Chaire des Etudes Mexicaines by the University of Paris III (Sorbonne Nouvelle). He is a member of the Mexican Academy of Sciences and attained the highest level (III) of the National Researchers System (Sistema Nacional de Investigadores).

Since 2007 Imanol Ordorika is General Director for Institutional Assessment (Director General de Evaluación Institucional) at UNAM.  Here has been in charge of the design and development of the Mexican Universities Comparative Study.

Publications

Books
 Pusser, B., Marginson, S., Kempner, K. y Ordorika, I. (Eds.), (2011), Universities and the Public Sphere: Knowledge creation and state building in the era of globalization, Routledge-Taylor and Francis, New York, NY. 
 Marginson, S. y Ordorika, I., (2010), Hegemonía en la era del conocimiento: competencia global en la educación superior y la investigación científica, México, DF, Seminario de Educación Superior-UNAM
 Pusser, B., Ordorika, I.y Kempner, K. (Eds.), (2010), Comparative Education (2a edición). ASHE Reader Series on Higher Education, Boston, MA. Pearson Learning Solutions.
 Ordorika, I.y Rodríguez, R.(Coords.), (2010), Evaluación institucional en la UNAM: primer volumen (2009). Universidad Nacional Autónoma de México. México, DF. 
 Ordorika, I., López R., (2007), Política Azul y Oro: Historias orales, relaciones de poder y disputa universitaria, México, DF, Seminario de Educación Superior-UNAM / Plaza y Valdés.
 Ordorika, I. (2006), La disputa por el campus: Poder, política y autonomía en la UNAM, México, DF, Seminario de Educación Superior-UNAM / CESU-UNAM / Plaza y Valdés.
 Ordorika, I. (2003), Power and Politics in University Governance: Organization and Change at the Universidad Nacional Autónoma de Mexico, New York, NY, Routledge Falmer.
 Ordorika, I. (Ed.), (2004), La academia en jaque: Perspectivas políticas sobre la evaluación de la educación superior en México, México, DF, Seminario de Educación Superior-UNAM/CRIM-UNAM / Grupo Editorial Miguel Angel Porrua.
 Martínez Della Rocca, Salvador y Ordorika, Imanol, (1993), UNAM, espejo del mejor México posible: la universidad en el contexto educativo nacional, México, DF, Ediciones Era.

Book chapters
 Ordorika, Imanol (2015), “Los estudiantes desplazados: la universidad ante la globalización y la privatización”.In Nieto Gutiérrez, Javier (Ed.) Adolescentes y juventud: de hoy al mañana, Coordinación de la Investigación Científica / UNAM, pp. 43–50, DOI: 10.13140/RG.2.1.1260.7605.
 Ordorika, Imanol (2015), “Autonomía universitaria: una relación política histórica”, en Bárzana, Eduardo, Martuscelli, Jaime y Morales, María Ascensión (coords.) La Autonomía Universitaria en México, Universidad Nacional Autónoma de México, pp. 387–408, .
 Martínez Stack, J., Lloyd, M., y Ordorika, I. (2015). “The impact of government policies on the profiles and attitudes of academics in two emerging economies: Brazil and Mexico”. En W.K. Cummings, U. Teichler (eds.), The Relevance of Academic Work in Comparative Perspective, The Changing Academy – The Changing Academic Profession in International Comparative Perspective 13, pp. 193–216. , .
 Ordorika Imanol and Lloyd, Marion W (2015) “Critical Theories of the State and Contest in Higher Education in the Globalized Era”, en Martínez-Alemán, A., Bensimon, E. y Pusser, B. (eds.), Critical Approaches to the Study of Higher Education: a Practical Introduction. The Johns Hopkins University Press, Baltimore, MD, pp. 130–152, .
 Ordorika, Imanol (2013), “Una nueva hegemonía: gestación de la Ley Orgánica de 1944-45” en Domínguez, Raúl (Ed.) Historia General de la Universidad Nacional en el siglo XX: un nuevo modelo de Universidad, la UNAM entre 1945 y 1972, UNAM, Instituto de Investigaciones sobre la Universidad y la Educación, México, DF, pp. 23–42, .
 Ordorika, Imanol (2013), “La universidad constructora de Estado”, en Rodríguez, Roberto (Coord.) El siglo de la UNAM: vertientes ideológicas y políticas del cambio institucional, Grupo editorial Miguel Angel Porrua-UNAM, México, DF, pp. 105–130, .
 Ordorika Imanol and Lloyd, Marion W (2013) “A decade of international university rankings: a critical perspective from Latin America”, in P.T.M. Marope, P.J. Wells and E. Hazelkorn (eds) Rankings and Accountability in Higher Education: Uses and Misuses, UNESCO, Paris, pp. 209–234, .
 Lloyd, M., Martínez Stack, J., and Ordorika, I. (2013), “Una aproximación a la definición de la metodología y aplicaciones de las comparaciones educativas institucionales” en Navarro Leal, Marco Aurelio y Navarrete Cazales, Zaira (coords.) Comparar en educación: diversidad de intereses, diversidad de enfoques, Sociedad Mexicana de Educación Comparada/ Colegio de Tamaulipas, México, pp. 29–46.
 Ordorika, Imanol and Rodríguez Gómez, Roberto (2012), “Cobertura y estructura del Sistema Educativo Mexicano: problemática y propuestas”, en Narro Robles, José, Martuscelli Quintana, Jaime y Bárzana García, Eduardo (Coords.) Plan de diez años para desarrollar el Sistema Educativo Nacional, Universidad Nacional Autónoma de México, México, DF, pp. 197–222, .
 Ordorika, Imanol (2011). “Del inicio del rectorado de Pablo González Casanova al Congreso Universitario”, en Chehaibar, Lourdes (Ed.), La UNAM en la historia de México, volumen VII, UNAM, México, DF, pp. 145–155, .
 Rodríguez-Gómez, Roberto y Ordorika, Imanol (2011). “The Chameleon’s Agenda: Entrepreneuralization of Private Higher Education in Mexico”, en Pusser, Brian, Simon Marginson, Kempner, Kenneth y Ordorika, Imanol (Eds.), Universities and the Public Sphere: Knowledge creation and state building in the era of globalization, Routledge-Taylor and Francis, New York, NY, .
 Marginson, Simon y Ordorika, Imanol (2011). "'El central volumen de la fuerza' (The hegemonic global pattern in the reorganization of elite higher education and research)". In Rhoten, Diana y Calhoun, Craig (Eds.) The Transformation of “Public” Research Universities: Shaping an International and Interdisciplinary Research Agenda for the Social Sciences.  Social Science Research Council Press, New York.
 Ordorika, Imanol (2009). "Commitment to society: contemporary challenges for public research universities."  Higher Education at a Time of Transformation (New Dynamics for Social Responsibility).  Global University Network for Innovation.  Palgrave-Macmillan, New York, pp. 72–74.  Also published in Spanish in La Educación Superior en Tiempos de Cambio(Nuevas dinámicas para la responsabilidad social).  Ediciones Mundi-Prensa.  Barcelona, pp. 72–74.
Ordorika, Imanol (2008). "Commitment to society: contemporary challenges for public research universities." Higher Education in the World 3 (Higher Education: New Challenges and Emerging Roles for Human and Social Development).  Global University Network for Innovation.  Palgrave-Macmillan, New York, pp. 14–19.  Also in La Educación Superior en el Mundo 2008.  Ediciones Mundi-Prensa.  Barcelona, pp. 14–19.
Ordorika, Imanol (2008). "Violencia y porrismo en la educación superior en México".  In Bertussi, Guadalupe Teresinha (Ed.) Anuario educativo mexicano: visión retrospectiva, año 2005, Universidad Pedagógica Nacional - Miguel Ángel Porrúa, México, pp. 459–475.  Also online at https://web.archive.org/web/20090902072246/http://anuario.upn.mx/site/static/26_Ordorika.pdf.
Ordorika, Imanol and Pusser, Brian. (2007). "La máxima casa de estudios: The Universidad Nacional Autónoma de México as a State-Building University." In Altbach, Philip y Balán, Jorge (Eds.) World-Class Worldwide: Transforming Research Universities in Asia and Latin America. Johns Hopkins University Press, pp. 189–215.  Also published in Chinese, in 2007, by Shanghai Jiao Tong University Press, pp. 161–181 and in Korean, in 2007, by Yoyoowahaksa, pp. 185–214.
 Bensimon, Estela y Ordorika, Imanol. (2005). "Mexico's Estímulos: Faculty compensation based on piece-work." In Rhoades, A Robert and Torres, Carlos (Editors). The political economy of globalization: The University, State and Markets in the Americas. Stanford University Press.

Articles
 Ordorika, Imanol, Gil, Manuel, Rodríguez, Roberto y Rueda, Mario (2016). “Reforma educativa y evaluación docente: El debate”. En Perfiles Educativos, vol. XXXVIII, núm. 151, enero-marzo, pp. 190–206.
 Ordorika Imanol y Lloyd, Marion (2015), “International rankings and the contest for university hegemony”, en Journal of Education Policy, Vol. 30, Issue 3, pp. 385–405, .
 Ordorika Imanol y Lloyd, Marion W (2014), “Teorías críticas del Estado y la disputa por la educación superior en la era de la globalización”, en Perfiles Educativos, vol. 36, núm. 145, pp. 122–139, .
 Ordorika, Imanol (2014), “Governance and Change in Higher Education: The Debate Between Classical Political Sociology, New Institutionalism and Critical Theories”, en Bordon. Revista de Pedagogía, vol. 66, núm. 1, pp. 107–121, e-.
 Ordorika, Imanol (2012). “Tareas pendientes de la política en educación superior y la importancia de reafirmar la visión progresista de la autonomía universitaria en el contexto actual”, en Perfiles Educativos, vol. XXXIV, número especial, pp. 176–180. .
 Ordorika, Imanol (2012), “Cómo se comparan las universidades públicas con las privadas” (transcripción de participación en el seminario ¿Créditos educativos en México? ¡No!, participantes: Rodríguez, R, Suárez, H, Márquez, A, Lloyd, M, Ordorika, y Muñoz, H.) en Perfiles Educativos, vol. XXXIV, núm. 136, pp. 199–202.
 Ordorika Sacristán, Imanol, Martínez Stack, Jorge, Ramírez Martínez, Rosa María (2011) “La transformación de las formas de gobierno en el Sistema Universitario Público Mexicano: Una Asignatura Pendiente”, en Revista de la Educación Superior, ANUIES, Vol. XL (4), No. 160, México, DF, pp. 51–68.
 Ordorika, Imanol (2010). “Autonomía universitaria: una perspectiva política” en Perfiles Educativos, tercera época, volumen XXXII, número especial, pp. 79–94.
 Ordorika, Imanol y Rodríguez, Roberto (2010). “El ranking Times en el mercado del prestigio universitario” en Perfiles Educativos, volumen XXXII, número 129, julio-septiembre de 2010, pp. 8–29.* Ordorika, Imanol (2008). "Los límites de la autonomía universitaria."  Educación Superior: cifras y hechos, Centro de Investigaciones Interdisciplinarias en Ciencias y Humanidades, UNAM, no. 39–40, vol. 7, May–August, pp. 24–40.

External links
 http://www.ses.unam.mx/ordorika/
 Curriculum Vitae
 Imanol Ordorika Wikipedia en español
 https://www.researchgate.net/profile/Imanol_Ordorika

1958 births
People from Mexico City
National Autonomous University of Mexico alumni
Stanford University alumni
University of Virginia faculty
Academic staff of Sorbonne Nouvelle University Paris 3
Living people
Party of the Democratic Revolution politicians
Stanford Graduate School of Education alumni